Entomoscelis americana, the red turnip beetle, is a species of leaf beetle in the family Chrysomelidae. It is found in North America.

In 2020, Entomoscelis americana was found to be a synonym of Entomoscelis adonidis from the Palearctic realm.

References

Further reading

External links

 

Chrysomelinae
Articles created by Qbugbot
Beetles described in 1942